Patal (also Romanized as Pātal) is a village in Bemani Rural District, Byaban District, Minab County, Hormozgan Province, Iran. At the 2006 census, its population was 236, in 38 families.

References 

Populated places in Minab County